Sağdıçlar is a village in the Keban District of Elazığ Province in Turkey. Its population is 186 (2021).

References

Villages in Keban District